The 13th Alley is a 2008 independent horror film directed by Bobb Hopkins. The film had its premiere at the 2008 Portland Underground Film Festival on June 13, 2008. The film stars Robert Carradine and Shayne Lamas, and centers around two college students that go to a bowling alley, only for strange things to start occurring.

Cast
 Robert Carradine as Hal
 Randy Wayne as Matt
 Bobb Hopkins as Zeke
 Shayne Lamas as Ashley

Release
The 13th Alley was self-published to DVD on December 10, 2009 directly through the film's website. Dread Central reviewed the movie, writing: "Simply put, The 13th Alley may very well be one of the worst movies of all time. It's simply awful, really awful, 'Oh, my god, I cannot believe I saw this in a theater' awful; the kind of awful that actually transcends awfulness and becomes entertaining in spite of itself. This is one for the ages. I haven't laughed out loud this much at a movie in a long time."

References

External links
 Official MySpace
 

2008 horror films
2008 films
American horror films
American independent films
2008 independent films
2000s English-language films
2000s American films